Sobral Pichorro is a former civil parish in the municipality of Fornos de Algodres, district of Guarda, Portugal. In 2013, the parish merged into the new parish Sobral Pichorro e Fuinhas.

Gallery

References

Fornos de Algodres